Nudgee railway station is located on the Shorncliffe line in Queensland, Australia. It serves the Brisbane suburb of Nudgee.

Services
Nudgee station is served by all stops Shorncliffe line services from Shorncliffe to Roma Street, Cannon Hill, Manly and Cleveland

Services by platform

References

External links

Nudgee station Queensland Rail
Nudgee station Queensland's Railways on the Internet
[ Nudgee station] TransLink travel information

Railway stations in Brisbane